Kate Mitchell may refer to:
 Kate Mitchell (EastEnders), a fictional character from the BBC soap opera EastEnders
 Kate Mitchell (politician), Canadian politician

See also
 Katie Mitchell, English theatre director